"Chu-Lip" is Ai Otsuka's 14th single under the avex trax label. It is also her first single released in 2007.

"Chu-Lip", marks the first time that Otsuka has released more than 3 singles before the release of an album. "Chu-Lip" is a play on the Japanese word for tulip, combining the sound of a kiss ("chu") with the English word "lip." The title track of the single is used as the theme song for the TBS drama Kirakira Kenshuii, starring Manami Konishi and Eiji Wentz from WaT. The b-side of the single is "Kimi ni Kaeru.", which is a med-tempo song. The term kaeru can mean "returning" or "frog," thus the title can also be translated into "Giving You a Frog.". Otsuka can sometimes be seen carrying a stuffed animal frog on her TV performances for "CHU-LIP" because of this. Otsuka also wore a frog ring at the 58th Kōhaku Uta Gassen.

The single debuted at #3 during its first week with 55,362 copies sold. Altogether it has sold 105,233 copies and continues to chart on Oricon.

The single has been certified as being downloaded more than 1,000,000 times as a ringtone by the RIAJ, and more than 250,000 times as a full-length download to cellphones.

Track listing

Charts 
Oricon Sales Chart (Japan)

References

2007 singles
Ai Otsuka songs
Japanese television drama theme songs
Songs written by Ai Otsuka
2007 songs
Avex Trax singles